The 2020 Svenska Cupen Final was played on 30 July 2020 between Allsvenskan clubs IFK Göteborg and Malmö FF. The match was played on Gamla Ullevi, the home ground of IFK Göteborg. The final was the culmination of the 2019–20 Svenska Cupen, the 64th season of Svenska Cupen and the eight season with the current format. The final was initially planned for 30 April 2020 but was postponed due to the COVID-19 pandemic. As a consequence of the pandemic, the final was played without attendance.

IFK Göteborg won the match 2–1 after extra time, their eighth Svenska Cupen title, and earned a place in the second qualifying round of the 2020–21 UEFA Europa League.

Teams

Venue
Since the 2014–15 season, the venue for the Svenska Cupen final is decided in a draw between the two finalists. The draw for the final was held on 9 July 2020, immediately after the semi-finals, and decided that the final would be played at Gamla Ullevi in Gothenburg, the home venue of IFK Göteborg. This was the second cup final to be hosted at the venue and the first since 2015, notably the last time IFK Göteborg made an appearance in the cup final.

Background
The Allsvenskan clubs IFK Göteborg and Malmö FF contested the final, with the winner earning a place in the second qualifying round of the 2020–21 UEFA Europa League. Malmö FF were already qualified for the first qualifying round of the 2020–21 UEFA Europa League through their position in the 2019 Allsvenskan.

IFK Göteborg played their first final since 2015 and their thirteenth in total. Malmö FF played their first final since 2018 and their 20th in total. IFK Göteborg won their seventh title in their previous final appearance while Malmö FF have lost in their last three final appearances. Having previously met in 1986, this was the second final to contest the two clubs. Malmö FF won the prior meeting in the final of the competition. Prior to the final, Malmö FF had won four straight league matches and found themselves in second place in the league table while IFK Göteborg had tied their last four games and were sitting in 11th place. The clubs also played each other in the league three days after the cup final, also at Gamla Ullevi, with Malmö FF winning 3–0.

Route to the final

Note: In all results below, the score of the finalist is given first.(H: home, A: away)

Match

Details

Statistics

See also
 2019–20 Svenska Cupen
 IFK Göteborg–Malmö FF rivalry

Notes

References

2020
Cup
IFK Göteborg matches
Malmö FF matches
July 2020 sports events in Sweden
Sports competitions in Gothenburg